Baron  was an admiral in the early Imperial Japanese Navy.

Biography
Samejima was born to a samurai family of Satsuma Domain (present-day Kagoshima Prefecture) and served as a Satsuma samurai in the Boshin War of the Meiji restoration. He entered the fledgling Imperial Japanese Navy in 1871, serving on the corvette  and fought against his fellow ex-samurai in the suppression of the Saga Rebellion and the Satsuma Rebellion. Samejima was promoted to lieutenant in 1877, lieutenant commander in 1882, commander in 1886, and captain later that year. He served as executive officer on the corvette  from 1878 through 1884.

Sent to France in 1891, he oversaw the completion of the cruiser  and its maiden voyage from France to Japan and remained her captain until 1893.

In May 1893, Samejima was chief-of-staff of Yokosuka Naval District and from June 1894 was chief-of-staff of the Readiness Fleet and of the Combined Fleet from July 1894. During the First Sino-Japanese War, he fought in the Battle of the Yellow Sea. In December 1894, he was promoted to rear admiral.

He subsequently served as Commandant of the Naval Staff College from November 1896, and was promoted to vice admiral in 1897. In February 1898, he became commander-in-chief of the Yokosuka Naval District, and in January 1899 was commander of the Readiness Fleet.

In May 1900 Samejima became commander of the Sasebo Naval District, a post he held throughout the Russo-Japanese War. In 1901, he was awarded the Order of the Rising Sun, 1st class.

Samejima was promoted to admiral in November 1905 and in 1906 was awarded the Order of the Golden Kite, 2nd class. Furthermore, in early 1907, he was ennobled with the title of baron (danshaku) in the kazoku peerage system. He entered the reserves later that year.

His son, Tomoshige Samejima was an admiral in the Imperial Japanese Navy in World War II, and his daughter married admiral Isamu Takeshita.

References

1852 births
1910 deaths
Shimazu retainers
People from Satsuma Domain
Military personnel from Kagoshima Prefecture
Imperial Japanese Navy admirals
People of the Boshin War
Japanese military personnel of the First Sino-Japanese War
Japanese military personnel of the Russo-Japanese War
Recipients of the Order of the Golden Kite
Grand Cordons of the Order of the Rising Sun
Kazoku